Slawson is a surname. Notable people with the surname include:

Brian Slawson (born 1956), American percussionist
Shelby Slawson (born 1960), American attorney, businesswoman, and politician.
Spike Slawson, American musician
Steve Slawson (born 1972), English footballer
Wayne Slawson, American composer

See also
Bennington, Indiana, or Slawson, unincorporated community
Slawson Mountain, is a mountain in Sullivan County, New York.

rtt